Hughesdale railway station is located on the Pakenham and Cranbourne lines in Victoria, Australia. It serves the south-eastern Melbourne suburb of Murrumbeena, and opened on 28 February 1925.

History
Hughesdale station opened on 28 February 1925 and, like the adjoining suburb, was named in honour of James Vincent Hughes, mayor of Oakleigh from 1924 to 1925. He, with the Poath Road Railway Station League, had lobbied strongly for a new station for the area. Before the station was built, Hughesdale had been the site of the junctions of both the Outer Circle and Rosstown lines with the Dandenong/Gippsland line.

In 1972, boom barriers replaced hand gates at the former Poath Road level crossing, which was located at the up end of the station.

In 1977, the former ground-level station building was rebuilt, after the original station building, which was of a timber construction, was destroyed by fire in 1975.

In 2016, the Level Crossing Removal Authority announced a grade separation project to eliminate the Poath Road level crossing immediately to the west of the station. On 14 October 2017, the railway station was closed, and was demolished on 28 October of that year. On 25 August 2018, a new station opened about 250 metres west of the former one, as part of construction of the new section of elevated rail line between Caulfield and Oakleigh.

Platforms and services
Hughesdale has one island platform with two faces. It is served by Pakenham and Cranbourne line trains.

Platform 1:
  all stations and limited express services to Flinders Street
  all stations and limited express services to Flinders Street

Platform 2:
  all stations and limited express services to Pakenham
  all stations services to Cranbourne

Future services:
In addition to the current services the Network Development Plan Metropolitan Rail proposes linking the Pakenham and Cranbourne lines to both the Sunbury line and under-construction Melbourne Airport rail link via the Metro Tunnel.
  express services to West Footscray and Sunbury (2025 onwards)
  express services to Melbourne Airport (2029 onwards)

Transport links
Ventura Bus Lines operates one route via Hughesdale station, under contract to Public Transport Victoria:
 : Westfield Southland – Box Hill station

Gallery

References

External links
 
 Melway map at street-directory.com.au

Railway stations in Melbourne
Railway stations in Australia opened in 1925
Railway stations in the City of Glen Eira